Jürgen Krüger (born 23 November 1954) is a German former swimmer. He competed in the men's 100 metre backstroke at the 1972 Summer Olympics.

References

External links
 

1954 births
Living people
German male swimmers
Olympic swimmers of East Germany
Swimmers at the 1972 Summer Olympics